Stay Tru is a solo studio album by American rapper Pastor Troy. It was released on April 18, 2006 via 845 Entertainment/SMC Recordings. Recording sessions took place at Upstairs Studio in Atlanta. Production was handled by P No, Cooley C, DJ Brad, Drumma Boy, HIN, Shawty Redd, and Pastor Troy, who also served as executive producer together with Greg Miller and Jarred Weisfeld. The album peaked at number 150 on the Billboard 200 in the United States.

Track listing

Personnel
Micah Troy – lyrics, vocals, producer (tracks: 3, 7), executive producer
HIN – producer (track 1)
P No – producer (tracks: 2, 6, 8, 9, 12)
Cooley C – producer (tracks: 4, 10)
Christopher "Drumma Boy" Gholson – producer (tracks: 5, 14)
Demetrius "Shawty Redd" Stewart – producer (track 11)
DJ Brad – producer (track 13)
Terrence Cash – engineering, mixing
Chris Kraus – engineering
Sean Riggins – engineering
Ali Eshai – assistant engineering
Kool Havis – assistant engineering
Greg Miller – executive producer
Jarred Weisfeld – executive producer
Justin Bellamy – A&R
Michael Holloway – management

Charts

References

2006 albums
Pastor Troy albums
SMC Recordings albums
Albums produced by Drumma Boy
Albums produced by Shawty Redd